Supriya Devi (Supriya Choudhury; 8 January 1933 – 26 January 2018) was an Indian actress who is known for her work in Bengali cinema for more than 50 years. She is best known for her portrayal of Neeta in Ritwik Ghatak's Bengali film Megha Dhaka Tara (1960). She was conferred the Filmfare Award and the BFJA Award twice. In 2011, she received the Banga-Vibhushan, the highest civilian honour in West Bengal. In 2014, she was awarded the Padma Shri by the Government of India, the fourth highest civilian award in India, for her contributions to the entertainment industry.

She made her debut in Uttam Kumar starrer Basu Paribar (1952) under the direction of Nirmal Dey and successively appeared in Prarthana (1952) directed by Pranab Ray. However, IMDb lists 1951 Hindi film Shokhiyan as her first film. She, then took a hiatus and returned to filmdom in Marmabani (1958) under Sushil Majumdar's direction. She rose to prominence after she had appeared in the Uttam Kumar blockbuster Sonar Harin (1959), directed by Mangal Chakraborty. At the beginning of the 1960s, she came to a bigger attention for her successive roles in films such as Meghe Dhaka Tara (1960), Shuno Baranari (1960), Komal Gandhar (1961), Swaralipi (1961), Agnisanskar (1961) and others. She made her Bollywood debut opposite Dharmendra in Begaana (1963) under Sadashiv Rao Kavi's direction.

Early life
Supriya was born in Myitkyina, Burma. Her father was Gopal Chandra Banerjee, a lawyer. He was from Faridpur (now in Bangladesh). During World War II, her family moved to Calcutta (present-day Kolkata, India).

Supriya was seven years old when she made her acting début in two plays directed by her father. She was a dancer since her childhood, even receiving an award from Thakin Nu, then-Prime Minister of Burma, who was moved by one of her dance recitals. From her childhood, her closest friend was Nihar Dutta, who married into the Guha Thakurata Family and became Mrs Nihar Guha Thakurata, an eminent Social Worker of Burma of her time.

In 1948, the Bannerjees left Burma for good and re-settled in Calcutta. They had been refugees in 1942 when the Japanese forces occupied Burma. The young Supriya and her family were forced to undertake an arduous trek on foot to the safety of Calcutta.

Career
In Calcutta, she resumed her dance lessons and trained under Guru Muruthappan Pillai and later under Guru Prahlad Das. Supriya and her family were on friendly terms with Chandrabati Devi who was their neighbour. It was through Chandrabati Devi's inspiration and contacts that Supriya Choudhury stepped into the world of Bengali films.

She made her debut in Uttam Kumar starrer Basu Paribar (1952) under the direction of Nirmal Dey and successively appeared in Prarthana (1952) directed by Pranab Ray and Shyamali (1952) directed by Binoy Bandyopadhyay. She, then took a hiatus and returned to filmdom in Marmabani (1958) under Sushil Majumdar's direction. She rose to prominence after she had appeared in the Uttam Kumar starrer blockbuster Sonar Harin (1959) directed by Mangal Chakraborty.

She rose to higher prominence after she had played the role of Amrapali in Amrapali (1959) directed by Sree Tarashankar and produced by Nalanda Films. Vyjayanthimala who was later found to play the same titular role was full of praise for her performance in the film.

At the beginning of the 1960s, she came to a bigger attention for her successive roles in films such as Meghe Dhaka Tara (1960), Shuno Baranari (1960), Komal Gandhar (1961), Swaralipi (1961) to name a few. She made her Bollywood debut opposite Dharmendra in Begaana (1963) under Sadashiv Rao Kavi's direction. She was applauded for her performance in the 1973 blockbuster Sanyasi Raja.

She was applauded for her performance in Raja Sen's National Award winning Bengali film Atmiyo Swajan (1998). Rediff described her performance in the film as "a fairly good fleshing out Supriya Devi".

Personal life
In 1954, Supriya married Bishwanath Choudhury and a few years later her only daughter Soma was born. The couple divorced in 1958.

She retired from films for a while before returning in the late 1950s. Later she was married to Mahanayak Uttam Kumar in 1963 and was living together till the death of Uttam Kumar in 1980, who was also a childhood friend of her youngest brother.

Supriya died of a heart attack in Kolkata on 26 January 2018, aged 85.

Filmography

Awards

 Won- Filmfare Awards East-Best Actress Award for Sister in 1977.
 Won- Filmfare Awards East- Lifetime Achievement Award
 Won- Padmashri-the fourth highest civilian award for her contribution to Indian Cinema.
 Won- Banga-Vibhushan - the highest civilian award in West Bengal in 2011.
 Won- BFJA Award-Best Actress Award for "Tin Adhay" in 1969.
 Won- BFJA Award-Best Supporting Actress Award for "Chhinnapatra" in 1973.
 Won- Kalakar Awards-Lifetime Achievement Award in 2001.

References

External links

Supriya Devi on Calcuttaweb
Supriya Devi on Facebook

1933 births
2018 deaths
20th-century Indian actresses
Actresses from Kolkata
Actresses in Bengali cinema
Bengali Hindus
Burmese Hindus
Burmese people of Indian descent
Indian film actresses
Indian Hindus
People from Myitkyina
People with paraplegia
Recipients of the Padma Shri in arts